The 2011 Akron Zips football team represented the University of Akron in the 2011 NCAA Division I FBS football season. The Zips were led by second-year head coach Rob Ianello and played their home games at InfoCision Stadium – Summa Field. They are a member of the East Division of the Mid-American Conference. They finished the season 1–11, 0–8 in MAC play to finish in last place in the East Division. This was the Zips second consecutive 1–11 season.

Following the season, Ianello was fired after going 2–22 in two seasons.

Schedule

References

Akron
Akron Zips football seasons
Akron Zips football